Projections is a 2013 Croatian drama film directed by Zrinko Ogresta.

Cast 
 Jasna Bilušić as Barbara
 Polona Juh as Natasa
 Vladimir Jurc as Professor Blau
 Ksenija Marinković as Alemka
 Jelena Miholjević as Simona
 Bojan Navojec as Bojan
 Ksenija Pajić as Irena

References

External links 
 Projekcije at hrfilm.hr

2013 drama films
2013 films
Croatian drama films
Films set in Zagreb